The 2009 Pan-American Volleyball Cup was the fourth edition of the annual men's volleyball tournament, played by seven countries from June 15 to June 20, 2009, in Chiapas, Mexico. The winner of each pool automatically advanced to the semi-finals and the teams placed in second and third met in crossed matches in the quarterfinals round.

Competing Nations

Squads

Preliminary round

Group A

June 15, 2009

June 16, 2009

June 17, 2009

Group B

June 15, 2009

June 16, 2009

June 17, 2009

Final round

Quarterfinals
Thursday June 18, 2009

Classification 5–6
Friday June 19, 2009

Semifinals
Friday June 19, 2009

Classification 6–7
Saturday June 7, 2008

Championship Round
Saturday June 20, 2009

Final ranking

Individual awards

Most Valuable Player

Best Scorer

Best Spiker

Best Blocker

Best Server

Best Digger

Best Setter

Best Receiver

Best Libero

Rising Star

References
 NORCECA Results
 USA Volleyball (Archived 2009-07-30)
 PUR Federation

Men's Pan-American Volleyball Cup
P
International volleyball competitions hosted by Mexico
2009 in Mexican sports